Yellow-bellied can refer to several turtle species:

 Yellow-bellied slider
 Yellow-bellied mud turtle 
 Red-eared slider × yellow-bellied slider

See also 
 Yellowbelly (disambiguation)

Animal common name disambiguation pages